Great Wolf Resorts (formerly known as Great Wolf Lodge) is a chain of indoor water parks. The company owns and operates its family resorts under the Great Wolf Lodge brand. In addition to a water park, each resort features restaurants, arcades, spas, and children's activities. Great Wolf Resorts is headquartered in Chicago, Illinois.

History
Great Wolf Lodge began as a small indoor water park resort called Black Wolf Lodge which was founded in 1997 by brothers Jack and Andrew "Turk" Waterman, the original owners of Noah's Ark Water Park in Wisconsin Dells, Wisconsin. Black Wolf Lodge was purchased by The Great Lakes Companies Inc in 1999. In 2000, president and founder, Craig A. Stark, and the team changed the name to Great Wolf Lodge and the company headquarters were established in Madison, Wisconsin. In 2001, the company built a second location in Sandusky, Ohio, and named it Great Bear Lodge. When a third location opened in 2003, the decision was made to place all future parks under the Great Wolf Lodge banner. The name of the Ohio location was changed to Great Wolf Lodge in 2004. The chain has since added sixteen additional locations and has one under construction.

On May 1, 2012, Great Wolf announced they were adding a new amenity or attraction to each of their resorts in time for the summer season. In addition, they spent over $4 million renovating the company's first two locations – Wisconsin Dells and Sandusky.

In April 2017, Great Wolf relocated their corporate headquarters to Chicago, Illinois.

Apollo acquisition
On March 13, 2012, Apollo Global Management announced an agreement to acquire the company for $703 million. Following the announcement, an investor group filed a complaint in Delaware Chancery Court stating that the deal, in which Apollo would pay $5 a share, undervalued the company. On April 12, 2012, KSL Capital Partners made an unsolicited offer of $6.25 a share, and Apollo followed suit raising its bid to $6.75 a share. KSL then raised its cash offer to $7 a share on April 8, 2012, beginning a rare public bidding war. After Apollo upped its offer again to $7.85 a share on April 20, 2012, KSL Capital Partners later announced it would not be making additional offers. The company's shares traded as low as $2.18 in October 2011, but they climbed above $5 following the announcement in March 2012 and reached a 52-week high of $7.50 during trading in April 2012.

Centerbridge acquisition
On March 24, 2015, Centerbridge Partners reached an agreement with Apollo to acquire the Great Wolf chain for $1.35 billion. The acquisition was finalized on May 12, 2015.

Blackstone and Centerbridge Joint Venture
In September 2019, Blackstone Group made a deal to purchase 65% controlling interest in Great Wolf Resorts from Centerbridge Partners. The two firms agreed to form a $2.9 billion joint-venture to own the company.

Properties

Great Wolf Lodge locations:

Previous locations:
Sheboygan, Wisconsin (2004–2011; now known as Blue Harbor Resort)

Locations under construction:
 Perryville, Maryland – Announced in December 2018, ground was broken on July 20, 2021, and the resort is expected to open on July 15, 2023.
 Mashantucket, Connecticut
 Naples, Florida – Estimated to cost $250 million to build, ground was broken on July 14, 2022, and the resort is expected to open in early–mid 2024.
 Bicester, Oxfordshire, England - A proposal to build a Great Wolf Lodge location in Chesterton near Bicester, Oxfordshire was submitted in 2019. The proposal was accepted by planning inspectors in 2021. Work on remodelling the plot of land acquired for the site began on 30 December 2021, with construction of the location itself beginning in 2022. The intended completion date for the construction of the Bicester location is scheduled for late 2024.

Locations under consideration:
 Squamish, British Columbia
 El Paso, Texas
 Little Egg Harbor, New Jersey
 Chester, New York
 Pompano Beach, Florida
 Cornwall, Ontario
 Basingstoke, Hampshire, England

Other brands
Great Wolf Lodge also owns MagiQuest.

In other media
Great Wolf's previous CEO Kim Schaefer was featured in the U.S. version of TV's Undercover Boss, which included visits to several lodges where she worked alongside a lifeguard supervisor, front desk clerk, and restaurant waitstaff as well as participated in the children's program.

Great Wolf Entertainment and 6 Point Harness produced a flash animated film, called The Great Wolf Pack: A Call to Adventure, which premiered at Great Wolf Resorts on Labor Day, September 5, 2022. The film follows the adventure of five newly-redesigned versions of mascot characters Wiley Wolf, Violet Wolf, Oliver Raccoon, Brinley Bear and Sammy Squirrel.

References

External links 

 
The Great Wolf Pack: A Call to Adventure on YouTube
Official trailer

Apollo Global Management companies
Hotels established in 1997
Companies based in Madison, Wisconsin
Hotels in California
Hotels in Kansas
Hotels in Michigan
Hotels in North Carolina
Hotels in Ohio
Hotels in Pennsylvania
Hotels in Texas
Hotels in Virginia
Hotels in Washington (state)
Hotels in Wisconsin
Water parks in California
Water parks in Canada
Water parks in Kansas
Water parks in Michigan
Water parks in North Carolina
Water parks in Ohio
Water parks in Pennsylvania
Water parks in Texas
Water parks in Virginia
Water parks in Wisconsin
Water parks in Arizona
Great Wolf Lodge, Niagara Falls
1997 establishments in Wisconsin